Mitcheldean Road railway station was a railway station that served the town of Mitcheldean  to the south and the village of Lea in Herefordshire. Opened in 1855 with the line it was located on the Great Western Railway line linking Ross-on-Wye and Gloucester.

In 1871 the Mitcheldean Road & Forest of Dean Junction Railway was formed to extend the line from Whimsey northwards to link up with the Hereford, Ross and Gloucester Railway at Mitcheldean Road, the line was taken over by the GWR in 1878 and completed, but never fully opened.

Nothing remains of the station and the site has been built over. The residential cul-de-sac which occupies the site is named Noden Drive after Reginald 'Dick' Noden who served as Station Master from the mid-1940s until the station's closure in 1964.

References

Further reading

External links
Mitcheldean Road on a navigable 1946 O. S. map
Photographs of the station in use

Former Great Western Railway stations
Disused railway stations in Herefordshire
Railway stations in Great Britain opened in 1855
Railway stations in Great Britain closed in 1964
Beeching closures in England